Ursa is a fictional supervillain appearing in American comic books published by DC Comics. She first appeared in the 1978 film Superman: The Movie portrayed by actress Sarah Douglas. The character made her comic book debut in Action Comics #845 (January 2007). An adversary of the superhero Superman and accomplice of General Zod, she is typically depicted as having been imprisoned in the Phantom Zone along with Zod and Non.

Character biography

Films

First appearing in Superman, she, General Zod and Non are put on trial following a failed coup against the Kryptonian government, found guilty, and sentenced to life imprisonment in the Phantom Zone. In particular, according to the prosecutor, Jor-El, her "perversions and unreasoning hatred of all mankind have threatened even the children of the planet Krypton", with Zod and Non being the only exceptions.

In the theatrical cut of Superman II, Ursa's hatred for all men remains intact, though her character is written to be softer. Additionally, Jor-El's speech is rewritten to imply that she has feelings for Zod. In the Richard Donner cut, she is portrayed as being vicious, cruel, and willing to kill as many men as she can. Additionally, she does not display affection for Zod, only remaining aligned with him because of their common goals. In both versions of the film, she displays a penchant for collecting and wearing symbols and badges from the law enforcement and military officers she kills. After Superman throws a powerful explosive (a hydrogen bomb in the theatrical cut and a nuclear missile in the Donner cut) into Earth's orbit, he inadvertently shatters the Phantom Zone, allowing Ursa, Zod, and Non to escape. Upon gaining powers from Earth's yellow sun, the trio head to Earth and force the President of the United States to surrender to them before forming an alliance with Lex Luthor to seek out Superman. Following several battles, Superman tricks Zod's forces into coming to the Fortress of Solitude, which he later bathes in red light to depower them. In the theatrical cut, Superman and Lois Lane subsequently send the trio down into the Fortress' bottomless depths, though a deleted scene depicts Zod's forces being arrested by human authorities. In the Donner cut, Superman travels back in time to ensure Zod's forces are re-imprisoned in the Phantom Zone.

Comics
Until 2006, the character of Ursa had never appeared in the Superman comic books, but a similar character, named Faora, made several appearances in the Pre-Crisis Superman comics. Faora was a Phantom Zone villain who first appeared in Action Comics #471 (May, 1977). Like Ursa, Faora hates all members of the male sex and was in fact sentenced to the Phantom Zone for "wantonly causing the death of 23 Kryptonian men in her own male concentration camp."

In JSA Classified #3, Power Girl (who was unsure about her true origins, at the time) was confronted by an escaped prisoner, from the Phantom Zone. He claimed that Power Girl's true identity, is Ursa, who had escaped the Zone with their help and promised to help the others escape. However, the prisoner was later revealed to be an illusion, created by the Psycho-Pirate.

Action Comics #845 (January 2007), which is the second part of the "Last Son" arc by Geoff Johns & Richard Donner, finally introduced Ursa to the Superman comic book canon. This version of her contains elements similar to the originally released version of Superman II (even though Donner is co-writing this arc) where she is in love with Zod. Zod and Ursa are the parents of the Kryptonian boy that Superman and Lois Lane adopted.

In a flashback in Action Comic Annual #10 a fleshed out retelling of the story told in Superman II partly aligned her story to her movie counterpart. Lover of General Zod, and part of the Kryptonian guard, she believed that Non and Jor-El were right about Krypton's final fate, and sought to rebel against the Council. When Non was kidnapped, lobotomized and turned into a brute with minimal intelligence and unable to speak, Zod and Ursa snapped, instigating open rebellion, while Jor-El surrendered to the Council, eventually using the Phantom Zone projector upon the trio during the trial seen in the movie. Ursa stayed loyal to Zod, even in their "exile", and believing that Jor-El should have been able to save Krypton, or at least his lineage, agreed with Zod in pursuing and taking vengeance over the House of El.

Ursa appears in another flashback alongside Zod in Action Comics #866. Here, she and Zod encounter Brainiac, who shrinks Kandor. During this encounter Brainiac killed the whole unit under Ursa's command. This paralyzes her with fear, changes her into the more vindictive person she is now. She runs a Black Ops squad that has been living on earth in secret. After Zod's attack on New Krypton she seem to be unable focus on her work and goes to Zod's side. Superman and even Non, lobotomized, seem to know her pain and seems to want to comfort her at this time. She is along with Superman or Commander El and Commander Gor now the leader of the Kryptonian military.

Despite her initial, brief joy in motherhood, she still shows the brunt of her misandric belief on her son, Lor-Zod, who was abused on a regular basis on the account of his perceived weakness (due to his conception in the Phantom Zone, Lor ages in uncontrollable grow spurts and exhibits weaker powers than the rest of his race under a yellow sun). As a result, Ursa is now completely estranged from Lor, who arrived on Earth and was raised as Chris Kent—the foster son of Clark Kent and his wife Lois Lane. Chris, upon returning to Earth one more time, openly defied his own legacy, mercilessly beating Ursa to save Thara Ak-Var, his current paramour. Ursa no longer considers Chris part of her family, and still resents Lois Lane for her bond with her estranged son.

This version has developed a weakness to bright light and wears goggles. This apparently came about as a side-effect of being imprisoned in the Phantom Zone repeatedly.

Following DC Rebirth, Ursa has been reintroduced in the new continuity as Zod's wife, along with their son Lor-Zod. After joining Henshaw's Superman Revenge Squad and making believe them to free his army, General Zod used the Phantom Zone projector to free them. Along with the Eradicator II, they fled to another planet, planning to create a New Krypton.

Powers and abilities
As a Kryptonian, Ursa derives her superhuman abilities from the yellow sun of Earth's solar system. Her basic abilities are high levels of superhuman strength, superhuman speed and superhuman stamina sufficient to bend steel in her bare hands, overpower a locomotive, outrun a speeding bullet and leap over a tall building in a single bound as well as heightened senses of hearing and sight including X-ray vision as well as telescopic and microscopic visions; virtual invulnerability; accelerated healing; longevity; heat vision; powerful freezing breath; and flight. Being female, her power levels are more akin to Supergirl and Wonder Woman.

Similar to other Phantom Zone escapees, Ursa typically never experiences the full measure of her abilities as she is never given enough time to absorb and metabolite the yellow solar energy of Earth's sun before she is defeated and banished back to the Zone. As such, Ursa could prove more powerful than even Supergirl and possibly Wonder Woman as well due to her being a fully matured Kryptonian female while Supergirl is a later adolescent Kryptonian female and Wonder Woman is an Amazon. Her full strength would also make her a sufficient threat to Superman due to her combat prowess.

Beyond just her superhuman strength and experienced hand-to-hand combat skills, Ursa is a ruthless killer who will do anything immoral to achieve her ends. She is fiercely loyal to General Zod and is willing to fight and die for his loyalty. Ursa is also a misandrist with an extreme sociopathic hatred of males, the only apparent exceptions being General Zod and her Phantom Zone cohorts. This sentiment seems to extend to a lesser degree to her own son, Lor-Zod, as she willingly and gleefully stood by while Zod violently and physically abused the young boy.

Like all Kryptonians, Ursa is vulnerable to Kryptonite and red solar radiation. Her virtual invulnerability does not provide protection from mind control or magic and can be overpowered and cause her to experience significant and even fatal injuries with significant force such as that of several atomic explosions or strikes from an opponent with superior strength and durability such as Doomsday. Her superhuman strength is inferior to the likes of Doomsday and her superhuman speed is inferior to Speedsters like the Flash. Her superhuman strength is limited due to her natural limits even while within the empowering light of Sol.

In other media

Television
 Ursa appears in the Superman (1988) episode "The Hunter", voiced by Ginny McSwain. This version is a Kryptonian criminal before she was sent to the Phantom Zone and collaborated with General Zod and Faora to create the titular Hunter to fight Superman.
 Ursa makes a non-speaking cameo appearance in the Legion of Super Heroes episode "Phantoms" as an inmate of the Phantom Zone.
 Ursa appears in the DC Super Hero Girls two-part episode "#DCSuperHeroBoys", voiced by Tara Strong. This version was sent to the Phantom Zone by Alura Zor-El.
 Ursa Zod appears in Young Justice: Phantoms, voiced by Vanessa Marshall. This version is the wife of Dru-Zod and mother of Lor-Zod who gets chosen by the Emerald Eye of Ekron to become the Emerald Empress.

Video games
 Ursa, alongside General Zod and Non, appears as the collective final boss of Superman (1987).
 Ursa appears in DC Universe Online, voiced by Adrienne Mishler.
 Ursa appears as a support card in the mobile version of Injustice: Gods Among Us.
 Ursa makes a cameo appearance in Sub-Zero's ending in Injustice 2. Following High Councilor Superman's imprisonment in the Phantom Zone, the Justice League accidentally open a portal that allows him, Ursa, Zod, and Non to escape while trying to send Sub-Zero back to his home universe.

References

Comics characters introduced in 2007
DC Comics characters who can move at superhuman speeds
DC Comics characters with accelerated healing
DC Comics characters with superhuman senses
DC Comics characters with superhuman strength
DC Comics extraterrestrial supervillains
DC Comics female supervillains
DC Comics film characters
DC Comics military personnel
Fictional characters with absorption or parasitic abilities
Fictional characters with air or wind abilities
Fictional characters with energy-manipulation abilities
Fictional characters with fire or heat abilities
Fictional characters with ice or cold abilities
Fictional characters with nuclear or radiation abilities
Fictional characters with slowed ageing
Fictional characters with superhuman durability or invulnerability
Fictional characters with X-ray vision
Fictional mass murderers
Film characters introduced in 1978
Kryptonians
Superman characters
Superman (1978 film series) characters

it:Ursa